Palaquium quercifolium is a tree in the family Sapotaceae. The specific epithet quercifolium refers to the leaves' similarity to the genus Quercus.

Description
The bark is red brown. Inflorescences bear up to 10 brownish tomentose flowers.

Distribution and habitat
Palaquium quercifolium is native to Sumatra, Borneo, Sulawesi and Ambon. Its habitat is lowland mixed dipterocarp forest and also swamp forest.

References

quercifolium
Trees of Sumatra
Trees of Borneo
Trees of Sulawesi
Trees of the Maluku Islands
Plants described in 1860
Taxa named by William Burck